The Statute of Autonomy of Catalonia of 2006 provides Catalonia's basic institutional regulations under the Spanish Constitution of 1978. It defines the rights and obligations of the citizens of Catalonia, the political institutions of the Catalan community, their competences and relations with the rest of Spain, and the financing of the Government of Catalonia.

This Law was approved by referendum on 18 June 2006 and supplanted the first Statute of Sau, which dated from 1979. The approval was given by the 36% of Catalan people with the right to vote. Abstention in the referendum was high: more than 50%. On 28 June 2010, the Constitutional Court of Spain assessed the constitutionality of several articles of the Law, rewriting 14 of them and dictating the interpretation for 27 more. That led to a massive demonstration in Barcelona of more than a million people under the slogan in Catalan Som una nació. Nosaltres decidim (in English, "We are a nation. We decide").

History
In 1919, a first project of Statute was started by the Commonwealth of Catalonia although it was rejected by Spanish Cortes Generales.

In 1928, a project of Constitution was written in Havana by exiled Catalan nationalists.

Catalonia first obtained a Statute of Autonomy in 1932, during the Second Spanish Republic. This law was abolished by General Francisco Franco after the Spanish Civil War, largely because Catalonia had been a region generally opposed to Franco's Nacionales forces. During periods of his rule, public usage of the Catalan language and culture, and more specifically, Catalan self-government were harshly suppressed..

In 1979, during the Spanish transition to democracy, the second Statute was approved by referendum.

On 18 June 2006, a referendum amending the Statute of Autonomy of Catalonia of 1979 to further expand the authority of the Generalitat de Catalunya, Catalonia's government, was approved, and became effective on 9 August 2006.

This referendum was noted for its voter turnout being below 50%.
It was also noted for its uneasy coalition forging. Tensions within the coalition government which originally promoted the Statute led to an early regional election in 2006.

2005 Draft
The "Draft of New Statute of Autonomy for Catalonia of 2005" was a reform proposal regarding Catalan self-government.

On 30 September 2005, the Catalan Parliament approved (with the support of 120 deputies to 15) a proposal for reform of the current Statute of Autonomy. The approved proposal was sent for review and discussion to the Cortes Generales (Spain's parliament) on 2 November 2005.

After receiving the proposal drafted by the Catalan regional parliament, on 2 November 2005 the Spanish Congress of Deputies approved the admission to formality of the Proposal for reform of the new Statute of Autonomy of Catalonia with the support of all the groups except the People's Party (PP). The latter filed an objection of unconstitutionality before the Constitutional Court of Spain, which ruled unconstitutional 14 articles of the original text. Its constitutionality has also been contested by some intellectuals and journalists related to liberal or conservative media such as the COPE (Catholic radio network) and the Madrid-based newspapers El Mundo and La Razón.

On 21 January 2006, Spanish Prime Minister José Luis Rodríguez Zapatero and Catalan Leader of the Opposition Artur Mas arrived at a pre-agreement about nation definition and financing in the current project of statute.

On 10 May 2006, the amended text passed through its final reading through both Houses of the Parliament, with the support of all parties except both the Spanish main opposition party, the conservative People's Party, and the Catalan separatist party Esquerra Republicana de Catalunya. The latter voted against the project in the Spanish Congress of Deputies but abstained in the Senate (to avoid a blocking vote). ERC voted against it, despite its senior members having had a hand in drafting its content, as a result of the internal tensions within the party which this issue had brought to the surface. Later on both parties, for opposite reasons, supported a no vote in the referendum held afterwards regarding the passing of the new Statute.

The president of Catalonia, Pasqual Maragall, decided that Sunday 18 June would be the date on which the text would be put to the Catalan people in the form of a referendum. The referendum approved the Statute, the "yes" side receiving 74% of votes cast. The voter turnout was 49.41% of the total electorate, an unprecedentedly low figure for this type of vote. The new Statute has been in force since 9 August 2006.

Data
 The 1931 referendum on the Statute of Autonomy registered a voter turnout of 75.13%, of which 99.49% voted favourably to its passing, according to the official results released.
 The 1979 referendum on the Statute of Autonomy registered a voter turnout of 59.7%, of which 88.1% voted favorably.
 The 2006 referendum on the current version of the Statute registered a voter turnout of 48.85%. Of the total votes, 73.24% were in favour of the new Statute, while 20.57% were against.

Self-government under the statute
Catalonia is an Autonomous Community within the Kingdom of Spain, with the status of historical region in the Spanish Constitution of 1978. In September 2005, the Parliament of Catalonia approved the definition of Catalonia as a 'nation' in the preamble of the new Statute of Autonomy (autonomous basic law).

The 120 delegates of all parties (CiU, PSC, ERC, ICV-EA) with the exception of the 15 delegates of the Partido Popular approved this definition.
In the opinion of the Spanish Government this has a 'declaratory' but not a 'legal' value, since the Spanish Constitution recognises the indissoluble "unity of the Spanish Nation".

The Generalitat de Catalunya is the institution in which the self-government of Catalonia is politically organised. It consists of the Parliament, the President of the Generalitat, and the Executive Council or Government of Catalonia.

The Statute of Autonomy gives the Generalitat of Catalonia the powers that enable it to carry out the functions of self-government. These can be exclusive, concurrent, and shared with the Spanish State or executives. The Generalitat holds jurisdiction in various matters of culture, education, health, justice, environment, communications, transportation, commerce, public safety, and local governments. Catalonia has its own police force, the Mossos d'Esquadra, although the Spanish government keep agents in the region for matters relating to border control, terrorism and immigration.

Most of the justice system is administered by Spanish judicial institutions. The legal system is uniform throughout Spain, with the exception of so-called "civil law", which is administered separately within Catalonia.

Differences with the Statute of 1979
The main goal of the new Statute of Autonomy was the consolidation and the further devolution of powers to Catalonia, most notably:

 Definition of Catalonia as a nation in the preamble of the law, while in Article 1 the definition remained as a "nationality", as in the 1979 Statute.
 Regulation of the national symbols of Catalonia: the flag, the national anthem, and the national day.
 Introduction of historical rights as one of the legal basis of self-government.
 Reinforcement of Catalan language as the proper language of Catalonia, establishing it the main language of Catalan administration and introducing the duty of Catalan citizens to learn it, alongside the Spanish language. The Occitan language (Aranese in Val d'Aran) is also recognized as an official language of Catalonia.
 Creation of an entire title (Title I) dedicated to the rights and obligations of Catalan citizens, apart from the ones of the Spanish Constitution.
 Establishment of Vegueries as the new territorial division of Catalonia, suppression of the four Spanish Provincial Councils.
 Reinforcement of the powers of the High Court of Justice of Catalonia. Estalishment of the High Prosecutor of Catalonia and the Council of Justice of Catalonia.
 Powers of the Generalitat over new matters and better definition of them, which included:
 Religious entities
 Landscapes
 Popular consultations, except referendums
 Maritime safety
 Attention and initial support for immigrants
 Transportation that circulates entirely through Catalan territory
 Labour inspection
 etc.
 Establishment of bilateral relations between the Generalitat and Spanish Government.
 Definition of foreign activity of Catalonia. Recognitions of delegations of the Catalan government abroad.
 Extension of financing powers:
 Creation of the Tax Agency of Catalonia, which collects and manages the own taxes of the Generalitat and those totally granted by the State
 Increase in participation of State taxes (IRPF, IVA, Society tax)
 Regulation of state investments in Catalonia

Criticism
Political parties, such as Cs and PP have pointed out what they describe as an "identity obsession" amongst Catalan nationalist politicians and the Catalan media establishment. They quote the unprecedentedly high abstention in the referendum regarding the Statute as a symptom of those cited sectors being out of sync with the populace at large. On the opposite side, Catalan nationalists, such as CiU, Republican Left of Catalonia (ERC), or CUP, think that the Statute does not give Catalonia sufficient self-government after it was modified by the Constitutional Court of Spain. They claim the Statute that was brought to referendum differed substantially from the one the Constitutional Court delivered on points considered key by these parties, starting the first massive Catalan demonstrations in favor of the Catalan independence.

Legal challenge and the Catalans' response
The Statute has been legally contested by the surrounding Autonomous Communities of Aragon, Balearic Islands, and the Valencian Community, as well as by the Partido Popular (then the main opposition party at the Spanish Parliament). The objections are based on various topics such as disputed cultural heritage but, especially, on the Statute's alleged breaches of the "solidarity between regions" principle in fiscal and educational matters enshrined by the Spanish Constitution of 1978.

The Catalan political arena largely viewed this debate as a sort of cultural war waged by "Spanish nationalists" (espanyolistes in Catalan). In response, four of the six political parties in the Catalan parliament (Convergence and Union, the Catalan Socialists, Republican Left of Catalonia, and Catalan green party), which that represented 88% of the popular, agreed to fight together in the Spanish Senate to reform the Constitutional Court of Spain to try to keep overturn of the Catalan Statute of Autonomy. The pact was particularly interesting because, aside from the fact that they all pertain to various degrees of Catalan nationalism, the four parties differ greatly in political ideology and together form nearly 80% of the Catalan Parliament. However, this attempt was largely unsuccessful.

After four years of deliberations, the Constitutional Court of Spain assessed the constitutionality of the challenged articles and its binding assessment was released on 28 June 2010. By a 6 to 4 majority, the Court's justices rewrote 14 articles and dictated the interpretation for 27 more, mainly those relating to language, justice and fiscal policy. The judgement reassured that the term "nation" used in the preamble has no legal standing. It also abolished all the mechanisms that had been put in place to minimize the distortionary effects of the existing Spanish tax and transfer system. The legitimacy of the decision has been widely questioned in Catalonia: the term of three of the twelve members of the Court had already expired when a decision had been made; a fourth member had died and the Spanish Parliament had not appointed any successor.

Following the decision of the Constitutional Court, Catalan public opinion grew increasingly favorable to hold a referendum to decide whether Catalonia should become an independent state from Spain. By September 2013, polls show different numbers according to the surveyor. According to the Spanish Agency (Centro de Investigaciones Sociológicas), there would be 40.6% of Catalans in favor of independence and 25.7% in favor of achieving more self-government, while 17.6% would be happy in the current situation and 9.1% of them would prefer to have less autonomy. According to the Catalan Agency (Centre d'Estudis d'Opinió), in the event of a referendum there would have been 55.6% of Catalans in favor of independence and 23.4% of them voting against it. The remaining percentages in either poll were still undecided. More recent polls in 2017 have suggested that support for independence has gone down slowly and steadily from its peak in 2012–13, with only 41% in favor of independence vs 49% against it. Regardless of the polls, when it came to the referendum, where, despite an estimated 770,000 votes being confiscated by the police, the voters overwhelmingly supported independence: 90.18% voting in favor, and only 7.83% voting against (with a voter turnout of 43%).

See also
 Catalonia
 Generalitat de Catalunya
 Autonomous communities of Spain
 Spanish transition to democracy
 Statute of Autonomy
 2010 Catalan autonomy protest

References

External links
 Full text of the 2006 Statute (in PDF)
 Catalonia endorses autonomy plan BBC News. 19 June 2006.
 Text of the 2005 Proposal for reform of the new Statute of Autonomy of Catalonia (in PDF)
 The controversial reform of the Statute of Autonomy of Catalonia

2006 in Catalonia
2006